Uropterygius micropterus is a moray eel found in coral reefs in the Pacific and Indian Oceans. It is commonly known as the tidepool snake moray, shortfin snake moray, or the shortfinned reef-eel.

References

micropterus
Fish described in 1852